Sateliti is a Bosnian root music group, formed in 1989. Today, they are the most popular root music group in Bosnia. The original singer and founder of the group, Muto, is still with the group and is the main vocalist.

Sateliti was started by Muto, Miki "Violina", and Carka. It is believed that Miki "Violina"left, but what really happened with him is unknown.
From 2003 to 2009, the members included Muto, Edin, Azis and Hazim.
In 2009, Edin, Azis and Hazim left and started their own group, "Edo i Sateliti Drine".

Members

Current
Muto - lead vocals
Edo - backing vocals, Sargija
Sadik - lead vocals, backing vocals, keyboards
Fudo - violin

Former
Edin - lead vocals, keyboards
Azis - violin
Hazim - backing vocals
Miki - violin
Carka - backing vocals

Discography
 To je život pravi - 1989
 Ratne pjesme
 Selam Podrinju - 2002
 Kad bi znala moja žena - 2003
 Kad bila žena ko švalerka - 2004
 Gori mi pod nogama - 2005
 Volim žene - 2006
 Nikad nisam - 2007
 Daleko je moja Bosna - 2008
 Hana konto otvorila - 2008
 Neka, neka Hano - 2013
 Kad se žene napiju - 2014
 Bijele bluze, svilene dimije - 2017
 Svoj na svome - 2018
 Plaču žene i spominju mene - 2019
 Udri Muški - 2019
 Žena zove, a švalerka piše - 2019

Bosnia and Herzegovina musical groups
Musical groups established in 1989